The Minister of Internal Affairs was the head of the Ministry of Internal Affairs, or INTAF, a department of the Rhodesian government concerned with the welfare and development of Rhodesia's rural black population. During the Rhodesian Bush War, the ministry also played a significant military role. The Minister of Internal Affairs was appointed by the Prime Minister of Rhodesia.

The office was first created in 1923 as the Colonial Secretary of Southern Rhodesia. In 1933, it was reconstituted as the Minister of Internal Affairs. In 1979, with the end of Rhodesia and the independence of Zimbabwe, the position was abolished. Its successor office is the Zimbabwean Minister of Home Affairs.

List of Ministers of Internal Affairs

Colonial Secretary

Internal Affairs

References

Rhodesia
Rhodesian politicians
History of Rhodesia
Government ministries of Rhodesia
Chief secretaries (British Empire)